Glenn Dale may refer to:

Glenn Dale, Maryland, in the United States
Glenn Dale Hospital, former tuberculosis sanitarium in Prince George's County, Maryland

See also
 Glen Dale (disambiguation)
 Glenndale (disambiguation)
 Glendale (disambiguation)